One Day is a song by Caro Emerald. The song was released as a Digital download on 13 September 2013 in the Benelux as third single from the album The Shocking Miss Emerald. The single was on BBC Radio 2's playlist in the 'A' list.
In Flanders (Belgium) the single peaked No25 in Ultratop 50 tipparade. In South Korea the single peaked No152 in the weekly chart (Gaon chart).

Track listing

Charts

Release history

References

2013 songs
Caro Emerald songs
2013 singles
Songs written by David Schreurs
Songs written by Vincent DeGiorgio